Maksym Vahifovych Pashayev (4 January 1988 – 12 December 2008) was a professional Ukrainian football defender of Azerbaijani origin who played for Dnipro Dnipropetrovsk in the Ukrainian Premier League. He died in a car accident in Hradyzk, Poltava Oblast, Ukraine.

Career
He was born in Krasnyi Luch, Luhansk Oblast, Ukraine. He was the product of the Dnipro Dnipropetrovsk Youth school system. With new Dnipro head coach Volodymyr Bezsonov, Pashaiv established himself in the starting lineup of the main team.

When he died in a car accident, he was the captain of the Ukraine national under-21 football team captain. His twin brother Pavlo Pashayev is also a football player and plays for Azerbaijan national football team.

References

Profile on Dnipro Official Website
Profile on EUFO
Profile on Football Squads

1988 births
2008 deaths
People from Krasnyi Luch
Road incident deaths in Ukraine
Ukrainian footballers
Ukraine under-21 international footballers
FC Dnipro players
FC Kryvbas Kryvyi Rih players
Ukrainian Premier League players
Ukrainian people of Azerbaijani descent
Ukrainian twins
Twin sportspeople
Association football defenders